Sulemana Tuntumba Boresa II was the Overlord of the Gonja Kingdom and President of the Savana Regional house of chiefs. He was enskinned in March 2010 after the demise of Bawah Abudu Doshie.

Early life 
Sulemana was born in the early 1930s to Yapeiwura Bakari the son of Yagbonwura Mahama of Kusawgu and Mma Nyenbali Chiraba. He was raised by his uncle in Zogu a village near Yapei after his father passed on. HIs father married eleven wives. Sulemana was the fourth born of the 30 children of his  father.

As Yagbonwura 
Sulemana before his enskinement as Yagbonwura, he was the Paramount Chief of the Kusawgu Traditional Area of Gonja under the skin name Kusawguwura Sulemana Jakpa. Since Kusawgu was among one of the five gates to the Yagbon seat of the kingdom he rose from being a paramount chief to be the Overlord. He was ekinned as Yagbonwura at Damongo in March 2010.

References